Taupin is a surname. Notable people with the name include:

André Taupin (born 1909), French sports shooter
Bernie Taupin (born 1950), English lyricist, poet, and singer
Eloi Charlemagne Taupin (1767–1814), French army general
René Taupin (1905–1981), French translator, critic, and academic

See also
Toupin, surname